Gliwice Arena is a multi-purpose indoor arena in Gliwice, Poland. It provides 13,752 seats in the stands (with room for up to 17,178 spectators) in the main arena and is considered one of the largest entertainment and sports halls in the country.

Initially, the venue was given the name "Podium Hall", which was later changed to "Hala Gliwice". Since opening in May 2018, this name is used interchangeably with the name "Arena Gliwice" which is used for international events.

Construction
The construction of the hall began in 2013 following the demolition of the former stadium. Initially, the city was counting on financial support from the European Union, but after the refusal, it was decided to finance the construction from the city's budget. The originally planned construction cost was to amount to PLN 321 million, and the construction was to be completed in mid-2015. According to the report on the implementation of the Gliwice city budget for 2017, the total outlays for the implementation of the investment in 2017-2018 amounted to PLN 420.4 million, 31% above the originally assumed amount.

Gliwice Arena has a two-level car park, the upper level of which can be adapted to organize events and outdoor exhibitions. The car park has 800 spaces. The facility is adapted to the needs of people with disabilities. There are 72 places available for them (36 places for wheelchair users and 36 for accompanying persons) located in all sectors and locations that guarantee good visibility. The main arena adjoined by a training hall and fitness building. The highest climbing wall in Europe and stage suspension system were also installed in the building.

Events
The first event that took place in the arena was a women's run as part of the cross-country event "Bieg Kobiet Zawsze Pier(w)si". During the event, which took place on 6 May 2018, a group of women ran through the main part of the hall. This race was part of an event organized for the fight against breast cancer. The official open days were organized on 12 and 13 May 2018, and on 30 May 2018, the concert of Armin van Buuren took place.

On 6 March 2019, the European Broadcasting Union (EBU) and Polish broadcaster Telewizja Polska (TVP) announced that the arena would host the Junior Eurovision Song Contest 2019. It took place on 24 November 2019, and marked the first time that Poland had hosted the event. Poland won the contest on homesoil with Viki Gabor and the song "Superhero". It was the second time that Poland won the contest and were the first country to win back-to-back.

This venue will host the 2022 FIVB Volleyball Men's World Championship and 2022 FIVB Volleyball Women's World Championship knockout phase.

See also 
List of indoor arenas in Poland
Sport in Poland

References

External links

Indoor arenas in Poland
Buildings and structures in Gliwice
Sport in Gliwice
Handball venues in Poland
Sports venues completed in 2018